The following is a partial list of the "A" codes for Medical Subject Headings (MeSH), as defined by the United States National Library of Medicine (NLM).

This list continues the information at List of MeSH codes (A12). Codes following these are found at List of MeSH codes (A14). For other MeSH codes, see List of MeSH codes.

The source for this content is the set of 2006 MeSH Trees from the NLM.

– animal structures

– air sacs

– anal sacs

– beak

– bursa of fabricius

– cloaca

– comb and wattles

– corpora allata

– crop, avian

– egg shell

– electric organ

– embryo, nonmammalian
  – chick embryo
  – chorioallantoic membrane

– fat body

– feathers

– forelimb
  – carpus, animal
  – wing

– ganglia, invertebrate

– gills

– harderian gland

– hemolymph

– hepatopancreas

– hindlimb
  – stifle
  – tarsus, animal

– hoof and claw

– horns 
  – antlers

– interrenal gland

– malpighian tubules

– mammary glands, animal

– metrial gland

– mushroom bodies

– nictitating membrane

– optic lobe

– oviducts
  – fallopian tubes

– perianal glands

– photoreceptors, invertebrate

– salt gland

– scent glands

– stomach, avian
  – gizzard
  – proventriculus

– stomach, ruminant
  – abomasum
  – omasum
  – reticulum
  – rumen

– tail

– ultimobranchial body

– vibrissae

– wool

The list continues at List of MeSH codes (A14).

A13